The Shan Nationalities Democratic Party (abbreviated SNDP), also known as the White Tiger Party or Kya Phyu Party is a political party in Myanmar (Burma).

Unlike the similarly named Shan Nationalities League for Democracy (SNLD), the party prefers the status quo of 7 states and 7 regions, rather than the SNLD's preference for a federal system with 8 states.

History
The party was formally registered in April 2010. The party's headquarters are in South Okkalapa Township, Yangon, and its chairman is Sai Ai Pao. In the 2010 general election, the party contested seats in Shan State, Kachin State and the Mandalay Region. After the 2010 general election, the two SNDP representatives in the Shan State Hluttaw, Sai Ai Pao and Sai Naw Kham, were appointed ethnic affairs ministers of Shan State.

In December 2011, the party's head office moved to Taunggyi, the capital of Shan State.

House of Nationalities (Amyotha Hluttaw)

House of Representatives (Pyithu Hluttaw)

By-election

See also

Shan Nationalities League for Democracy

References

Political parties in Myanmar
Political parties of minorities
Shan State
Political parties established in 2010
2010 establishments in Myanmar